Pieter De Spiegeleer (born 2 October 1981) is a Belgian politician who is a member of the Chamber of Representatives for the Vlaams Belang party.

De Spiegeleer worked as a civil servant and claimed he was bullied from his workplace as a result of his support for Vlaams Belang. In 2015, he set up a new Vlaams Belang chapter in Haaltert after the party did not compete in the municipality during 2012 local elections and lost its representatives. He took part in the municipal elections in 2015 for the first time with the renewed Haaltertse Vlaams Belang chapter and was elected as a municipal councilor. During the 2019 Belgian federal election De Spiegeleer stood in fourth place on the East Flanders constituency list and was subsequently elected to the federal parliament.

De Spiegeleer currently lives in Heldergem.

References 

Living people
21st-century Belgian politicians
1981 births
Vlaams Belang politicians
Members of the Chamber of Representatives (Belgium)
Belgian city councillors
People from Haaltert